Leifsonia xyli is a Gram-positive species of bacteria from the family Microbacteriaceae.

References

Microbacteriaceae
Bacteria described in 1984